The 2nd Massachusetts General Court, consisting of the Massachusetts Senate and the Massachusetts House of Representatives, met in 1781 and 1782 during the governorship of John Hancock. Jeremiah Powell and Samuel Adams served as presidents of the Senate and Caleb Davis served as speaker of the House.

Senators

Representatives

 Caleb Davis 
 Samuel A. Otis
 John Rowe

See also
 List of Massachusetts General Courts

References

External links
 
 

Political history of Massachusetts
Massachusetts legislative sessions
1781 in Massachusetts
1782 in Massachusetts